The Edward MacDowell Medal is an award which has been given since 1960 to one person annually who has made an outstanding contribution to American culture and the arts. It is given by MacDowell, the first artist residency program in the United States.

Background

The award is named for composer Edward MacDowell, who, with pianist Marian MacDowell, his wife, founded the MacDowell artist residency (formerly known as The MacDowell Colony) in 1907. The residency exists to nurture the arts by offering creative individuals of the highest talent an inspiring environment in which to produce enduring works of the imagination. Each year, MacDowell welcomes more than 300 architects, composers, filmmakers, interdisciplinary artists, theatre artists, visual artists, and writers from across the United States and around the globe

History of the award

Established in 1960 with the first award going to Thornton Wilder, the award is given to one artist each year, from among seven artistic disciplines, "architecture, visual art, music composition, theater, writing, filmmaking and interdisciplinary art."

Composer Aaron Copland was the second recipient of the award in 1961. Copland had been a resident of the artist's residency eight times between 1925 and 1956, and served as MacDowell's president from 1962 to 1968.

Painter Georgia O'Keeffe received the award in 1972. O'Keeffe, who was then 84 years old, decided not to attend, and asked art historian Lloyd Goodrich to accept the award on her behalf. Goodrich explained that O'Keeffe believed that her paintings were more important than her words.

When writer Mary McCarthy won the award in 1984, The New York Times sent culture reporter Samuel G. Freedman to Peterborough to interview McCarthy and cover the ceremony. McCarthy commented that if she knew that her nemesis, writer Lillian Hellman had won the award in 1976, she would have "probably not" accepted it.
 McCarthy conceded that the fact that her former husband, writer Edmund Wilson, had received the award in 1964 lent credibility to the honor.

Composer and conductor Leonard Bernstein won the award in 1987. Bernstein observed that it was the first award he had received solely for musical composition. Bernard Holland, writing in The New York Times, noted that Bernstein had "made full use of the quiet and solitude of this venerable refuge for artists" three times previously, having been a resident there in 1962, 1970 and 1972.

Award winner and writer William Styron spoke at the 1988 awards ceremony. He said that the group of previous winners "represents the brightest constellation of American talent that could be assembled in the latter half of this century", and that "their work has been of supreme value to the world".

Composer Stephen Sondheim, who won the award in 2013, was the first winner with a background in musical theater.

When California artist Betye Saar won the 2014 award, a reporter for the Los Angeles Times commented that she was "joining an elite roster of honorees."

Jazz composer and musician Gunther Schuller was scheduled to receive the 2015 award on his 90th birthday. However, Schuller died June 21, 2015 before he could receive the award.

Medal Day
The Edward MacDowell Medal has been awarded during a free, public ceremony at MacDowell grounds in Peterborough, NH, to such figures as Aaron Copland (1961), Robert Frost (1962), Georgia O'Keeffe (1972), Leonard Bernstein (1987), Stephen Sondheim (2013), and Betye Saar (2014). MacDowell Chair, Fellow, and author Nell Irvin Painter, hosts the ceremony typically held on a summer Sunday in July or August beginning at noon. Following the award ceremony, guests can have picnic lunches before open studio tours, which are hosted by MacDowell artists-in-residence.

List of recipients and speakers

References

External links
Yale University Library - Photo:Thornton Wilder receiving the first Edward MacDowell medal at Colony Hall, MacDowell Colony
Medal Day History and List of medalists, MacDowell
First posthumous Edward MacDowell Medal, Keene Sentinel
Medal Day 2014, Keene Sentinel
Medal Day 2013, Monadnock Center

MacDowell Medal
MacDowell Medal